ICHEC Brussels Management School, officially Institut Catholique des Hautes Études Commerciales, is a Brussels-based management school, constituting the economic category of the "Haute École ICHEC - ECAM - ISFSC". It also has several training and research centers. ICHEC offers university-level management training programs in both daytime and evening courses, in both initial and continuing education.

Programmes

ICHEC's programs include a three-year first cycle:

 Bachelor of Business Engineering,
 Bachelor of Business Administration,

and a second cycle of one or two years:

 Master's degree in Business Sciences,
 Master's degree in Management Sciences - English Track
 Master's degree in Commercial Engineering
 Master's degree in Business Management
 ICHEC programme
 Double degree program ICHEC - UCL (LSM)
 ICHEC - UCL - ULB triple degree program

 Master's degree in Business Management - International Track
 Master's degree Analyst in alternation ICHEC-ECAM
 Master's degree in Management Sciences - English Track

and a third cycle of one or two years:

 Complementary degree in management
 Teacher training

ICHEC also houses the École Supérieure des Sciences Fiscales (ESSF). For over 60 years, the ESSF has been a reference in the field of taxation in Belgium. The institution offers 2 Executive Masters and 6 certificates:

 Executive Master in Tax Law
 Executive Master in European and International Tax Law
 Certificate in Corporate Taxation
 Certificate in Personal Taxation
 Certificate in European and International Taxation
 Certificate in Indirect Taxation
 Certificate in Property Taxation
 Certificate in Tax Procedure and Recovery

Continuing education 

In parallel with its School of Management, ICHEC has  developed multiple continuing education programs for adults in management-related fields. Today, ICHEC Formation Continue is ICHEC's continuing education center and the preferred training partner for companies, organisations and individuals throughout their professional career.

Figures

Today, ICHEC has more than 3,000 students of 60 different nationalities, a network of more than 15,000 graduates, 15% of whom work abroad, brought together within the ICHEC-Alumni association, a faculty of more than 300 professors

Research

The ICHEC Research Lab (IRL) is dedicated to interdisciplinary research in economics and management. Its vision is to create a strong culture of research support throughout the ICHEC institution, facilitating interdisciplinary management research rooted in field practice. 46 researchers are currently working at ICHEC.

Location 
Located in Brussels, ICHEC has two locations (Montgomery and Manoir d'Anjou).

Accreditations 
ICHEC is the first French-speaking Belgian business school to have obtained the American quality label AACSB (Association to Advance Collegiate Schools of Business). Only 5% of the world's business schools have the AACSB label, which evaluates the quality of a business school. It is awarded for 5 years, after several reports and audits by experts on site.

Partnerships 
ICHEC is distinguished by its international dimension, which has become one of its main strategic axes. For more than 20 years, ICHEC has developed multiple and solid collaborations with more than 120 international partners throughout the world. These involve student mobility, faculty exchanges, the development of joint programs and research.

The double degree in finance co-delivered by the Louvain School of Management is recognised by the CFA (Chartered Finance Analyst). The CFA is a globally recognised standard and the achievement of this certification confers international professional recognition in the field of finance.

ICHEC is also the first French-speaking Belgian member of the CLADEA network, an important network of business schools based in Latin America.

Notable alumni

 Etienne Schneider, Luxembourg politician
 Alain Dehaze, CEO of Adecco Group
 Anne Zagré, Belgian athlete specialising in the sprint and long jump
 Camille Laus, Belgian athlete, 400 metres specialist
 Cédric Charlier, Belgian international hockey player
 John Lelangue, Belgian sports director of cycling teams (Phonak, BMC).
 Jean-Pierre Bemba, Congolese politician.
 Jeannine Mabunda, President of the National Assembly of the Democratic Republic of Congo.

References

External links
 ICHEC 

Universities and colleges in Brussels
Business schools in Belgium
Universities and colleges formed by merger in Belgium